The Austria women's national handball team is the national team of Austria. It is governed by the Austrian Handball Federation and takes part in international team handball competitions.

Competitive record
 Champions   Runners-up   Third place   Fourth place

Olympic Games

World Championship

European Championship

Team

Current squad
Squad for the 2021 World Women's Handball Championship.

Head coach: Herbert Müller

Technical staff

Notable players
Several Austrian players have seen their individual performance recognized at international tournaments.
MVP
Ausra Fridrikas, 1999 World Championship
All-Star Team
Marianna Racz, 1992 Summer Olympics
Sorina Lefter, 1995 World Championship
Ausra Fridrikas, 1999 World Championship, 2002 European Championship
Tanja Logwin, 2004 European Championship
Top Scorer
Ausra Fridrikas, 2001 World Championship (87 goals)
Katrin Engel, 2009 World Championship (67 goals)
Others
 Gabriela Rotiș
 Jasna Kolar-Merdan
 Stanka Bozovic
 Iris Morhammer
 Natascha Rusnachenko
 Laura Fritz
 Monika Königshofer
 Stephanie Ofenböck
 Stephanie Subke

Records
 Last updated: 5 February 2022Source: Austrian Handball Federation

Most appearances

Top goalscorers

References

External links

IHF profile

National team
Women's national handball teams
Women's national sports teams of Austria